"Remember (Sha-La-La-La)" is a song by the Bay City Rollers. It was first released as a single in early 1974 and then included on their debut album Rollin', which appeared several months later, in the autumn.

The single peaked at no. 6 on the UK Singles Chart.

Track listings 
7" single Bell 2008 229 (1974, Germany)
 "Remember" (2:33)
 "Bye Bye Barbara" (2:55)

Charts

References 

Bay City Rollers songs
1974 singles
1977 singles
RCA Victor singles
Songs written by Phil Coulter
Songs written by Bill Martin (songwriter)